Hugh Hiddleston (1855 – 14 May 1934) was an Australian cricketer. He played fifteen first-class matches for New South Wales between 1880/81 and 1888/89.

See also
 List of New South Wales representative cricketers

References

External links
 

1855 births
1934 deaths
Australian cricketers
New South Wales cricketers